John Matthew Mare (22 February 1854 – 11 December 1909) was an English cricketer.  Mare was a right-handed batsman.  He was born at Paddington, London.

Mare made his first-class debut for Sussex against Surrey in 1870.  He made 25 further first-class appearances for Sussex, the last of which came against Surrey in 1878.  In his 26 first-class matches, he scored a total of 616 runs at an average of 14.00.  An opening batsman, he only passed fifty once, narrowly missing out on a century when he scored 97 against Kent in 1872.

He died in England on 11 December 1909, though the exact place of his death is not known.

References

External links
John Mare at ESPNcricinfo
John Mare at CricketArchive

1854 births
1909 deaths
People from Paddington
English cricketers
Sussex cricketers